Sagan is an open source (GNU/GPLv2) multi-threaded, high performance, real-time log analysis & correlation engine developed by Quadrant Information Security that runs on Unix operating systems.   It is written in C and uses a multi-threaded architecture to deliver high performance log & event analysis. Sagan's structure and rules work similarly to the Sourcefire Snort IDS/IPS engine.   This allows Sagan to be compatible  with Snort or Suricata rule management softwares and give Sagan the ability to correlate with Snort IDS/IPS data.

Sagan supports different output formats for reporting and analysis, log normalization, script execution on event detection, GeoIP detection/alerting and time sensitive alerting.

See also 

 Host-based intrusion detection system comparison

References

 Sagan User Manual
 Sagan Resources
  "Centralized and structured log file analysis with Open Source and Free Software tools" Bachelor Thesis by Jens Kühnel
 IPSS.ca "Course objectives"
 "Securing your Mikrotik Network" by Andrew Thrift (Presentation)
  HOWTO build Sagan on FreeBSD
  Sagan was one of the "top security tools" & won a "Bossie Award" from Infoworld.com.
  Installing Sagan onCentOS 5/6 (Linux) for log monitoring.
 IPSS.ca "Course objectives"
 Champ Clark talks about Sagan on "Pauldotcom Security weekly" - December, 12th, 2013.
 Linux Pro Magazine article that discusses using Sagan for log monitoring.
 Article written by Champ Clark about using Kismet, Snort and Sagan to build wireless IDS monitoring device.
 Champ Clark's guest posting on Rainer's (author of rsysyslog) blog about Sagan and log analysis.
 Log, Log, Log Everything Remotely.
 Using Sagan with Bro Intelligence feeds.
 What the Sagan Log Analysis Engine Is...and What It Is Not (Aug 2016)
 Easing the Compliance Burden :: Sagan Technology & PCI Compliance (Feb 2016)
 JunOS/ScreenOS Vulnerability Helps to Emphasize the Importance of Remote Log Storage (Dec 2015)
 Using Sagan with Netflow data.
 Reference to Sagan rule options

External links
 About Sagan
 Official Sagan Wiki
Sagan flowbits
Using Sagan with Bro Intelligence feeds
Sagan output to other SIEMs.

Free security software
Computer security software
Linux security software
Unix network-related software
Intrusion detection systems